Bang! is a compilation album by Frankie Goes to Hollywood given a Japan-only release during 1985. It is the first compilation album by the group, and the first to gather together various remixes that were difficult to find at the time. The album has subsequently become a collectors item in its own right.

For collectors, the inclusion of the Hibakusha mix of "Two Tribes" was a real find. This mix was originally released on the incredibly rare (limited to 5,000 copies) third 12", catalogue number X ZIP 1.

Track listing
All songs written by Peter Gill, Holly Johnson, Brian Nash and Mark O'Toole, unless otherwise noted.
 "War" (Hidden) (Barrett Strong, Norman Whitfield) – 8:37
 "Relax" (U.S. Mix) (Gill, Johnson, O'Toole) – 7:20
 "Black Night White Light"  – 4:08
 "Welcome to the Pleasuredome" (Urban Mix)  – 8:08
 "Two Tribes" (Hibakusha) (Gill, Johnson, O'Toole) – 6:38
 "The Power of Love"  – 5:30

Notes
 "War (Hidden)" and "Two Tribes (Hibakusha)"  can also be found on Twelve Inches.
 "Black Night White Light" and "The Power of Love" are the common album versions from Welcome to the Pleasuredome.
 "Relax" (US Mix) saw its first CD releases on this album, but can now also be found on other compilations.
 "Welcome to the Pleasuredome" (Urban Mix) remains exclusive for this release.

References

Frankie Goes to Hollywood albums
Albums produced by Trevor Horn
1985 compilation albums